Karin Ptaszek (born 24 December 1971) is a former professional Danish tennis player.

Playing for Denmark at the Fed Cup, Ptaszek has a win–loss record of 23–16.

ITF finals

Singles (3–6)

Doubles (6–4)

References

External links
 
 

1971 births
Living people
Danish female tennis players